Pyroderces deamatella is a species of moth in the family Cosmopterigidae. It is endemic to New Zealand.

References

deamatella
Moths of New Zealand
Moths described in 1864
Endemic fauna of New Zealand
Taxa named by Francis Walker (entomologist)
Endemic moths of New Zealand